This is a list of British television related events in 1928.

Events

Births
3 January – Michael Barratt, English television presenter and announcer
27 January – Michael Craig, Indian-born actor and screenwriter
22 February – Bruce Forsyth, English entertainer and presenter (died 2017)
13 March – Ronnie Hazlehurst, English light music composer and director, theme tune composer (died 2007)
30 April – Dickie Davies, English sports presenter (died 2023)
1 June – Bob Monkhouse, English comedian, screenwriter, actor and game show presenter (died 2003)
12 July– Frank Windsor, actor (Z Cars) (died 2020)
22 July – Freda Dowie, English actress (died 2019)
1 October – Laurence Harvey, Lithuanian-born screen actor (died 1974)
8 October – Bill Maynard, English comic actor (died 2018)
12 November – Bob Holness, English radio and television host (died 2012)
12 December – Lionel Blair, Canadian-born actor, choreographer, dancer and television presenter (died 2021)
29 December – Bernard Cribbins, English comedy actor (died 2022)

See also
 1928 in British music
 1928 in the United Kingdom
 List of British films of 1928

References